() is a clear and colorless distilled alcoholic beverage popular in the Korean Peninsula. It is usually consumed neat. Its alcohol content varies from about 12.9% to 53% alcohol by volume (ABV), although since 2007 low alcohol soju below 20% has become more popular.

While  was traditionally made from the grain of  rice, wheat, or barley, South Korean ethanol producers replace rice with other starch, such as cassava due to significantly lower capital costs. Soju often appear similar to several other East Asian liquors while differing on alcohol contents.

Etymology 
Soju means "burned liquor", with the first syllable so (燒; "burn") referring to the heat of distillation, and the second syllable ju (酒) referring to "alcoholic drink". (Cf. Brandy.) In 2008, "soju" was included in the Merriam-Webster Dictionary. Merriam-Webster dated the word's appearance in the American English lexicon at 1951. In 2016, the word was included in the Oxford Dictionary of English. Chinese shāojiǔ, more commonly known as báijiǔ, and Japanese shōchū, with the altered second character, have the same origin as soju.

Another name for soju is noju ("dew liquor"), with its first letter ro (露; "dew") likening the droplets of the collected alcohol during the distilling process to dew-drops. Some soju brand names include iseul, the native-Korean word for "dew", or ro, the Sino-Korean word for "dew".

History and production 

The origin of soju dates back to the 13th century Goryeo, when the Levantine distilling technique was introduced to the Korean Peninsula during the Mongol invasions of Korea (1231–1259), by the Yuan Mongols who had acquired the technique of distilling arak from the Persians during their invasions of the Levant, Anatolia, and Persia. The distilleries were set up around the city of Gaegyeong, the then capital (current Kaesong). In the surrounding areas of Kaesong, soju is still called arak-ju. Andong soju, the direct root of modern South Korean soju varieties, started as the home-brewed liquor developed in the city of Andong, where the Yuan Mongols' logistics base was located during this era.

Soju is traditionally made by distilling alcohol from fermented grains. The rice wine for distilled soju is usually fermented for about 15 days, and the distillation process involves boiling the filtered, mature rice wine in a sot (cauldron) topped with soju gori (two-storied distilling appliance with a pipe). In the 1920s, over 3,200 soju breweries existed throughout the Korean Peninsula.

Soju referred to a distilled beverage with 35% ABV until 1965, when diluted soju with 30% ABV appeared with South Korean government's prohibition of the traditional distillation of soju from rice, in order to alleviate rice shortages. Instead, soju was created using highly distilled ethanol (95% ABV) from sweet potatoes and tapioca, which was mixed with flavorings, and sweeteners, and water. The end products are marketed under a variety of soju brand names. A single supplier (Korea Ethanol Supplies Company) sells ethanol to all soju producers in South Korea. Until the late 1980s, saccharin was the most popular sweetener used by the industry, but it has since been replaced by stevioside.

Although the prohibition was lifted in 1999, cheap soju continues to be made this way. Diluted soju has showed a trend towards lower alcohol content. The ABV of 30% fell to 25% by 1973, and 23% by 1998. Currently, soju with less than 17% ABV are widely available. In 2017, a typical  bottle of diluted soju retails at ₩1,700 (approximately $) in supermarkets and convenience stores, and for ₩4,000–5,000 (approximately $–) in restaurants.

Several regions have resumed distilling soju from grains since 1999. Traditional hand-crafted Andong soju has about 45% ABV. Hwayo is a brand with five different mixes constituting an ABV range from 17% to 53%.

In 2019, Jinro soju was the largest selling branded spirit in the world.Fruit sojus have been produced since 2015.

Etiquette

The most important rule in Korean drinking etiquette is that the youngest person in the group pours the drinks for their elders. It applies not only to age but also to the hierarchy within a company. When pouring alcohol, both hands should be used to pour. When receiving alcohol, both hands should also be used to hold the glass.

Soju outside Korea

China
There are a number of soju brands directly outside the Korean Peninsula for the ethnic Korean population, and most use rice as the foundation since the price is significantly cheaper than in South Korea. Soju from South Korea, from firms like Jinro, is also imported.

Canada
Liquors in Canada are subject to regulations that vary from province to province. In Ontario, the provincially run Liquor Control Board of Ontario (LCBO) sells soju, not all LCBO locations carry it. However, since the LCBO introduced online ordering in 2016, soju can be ordered for home delivery anywhere in the province.

United States
The liquor licensing laws in the states of California and New York specifically exempt the sale of soju from regulation relating to the sale of other distilled spirits, allowing businesses with a beer/wine license to sell it without requiring the more expensive license required for other distilled spirits. The only stipulation is that the soju must be clearly labeled as such and contain less than 25% alcohol.

This has led to the appearance in the United States of many soju-based equivalents of traditional Western mixed drinks normally based on vodka or similar spirits, such as the soju martini and the soju cosmopolitan. Another consequence is that the manufacturers of similar distilled spirits from other parts of Asia, such as Japanese shōchū, have begun to re-label their products as soju for sale in those regions.

Jinro's American division has partnered with Korean pop star PSY to promote Soju in the U.S., and in 2013 partnered with the Los Angeles Dodgers to sell Soju at its games.

Brands

Jinro is the largest manufacturer of soju accounting for half of all white spirits sold in South Korea. Soju accounts for 97% of the category. Global sales in 2013 were 750 million bottles. The most popular variety of soju is currently Chamisul (참이슬 - literally meaning "real dew"), a quadruple-filtered soju produced by Jinro, but recently Cheoeum-Cheoreom (처음처럼, lit. "like the first time") of Lotte Chilsung (롯데칠성) and Good Day (좋은데이) of Muhak (무학) are increasing their market share. However, the popularity of brands varies by region. In Busan, Shiwon Soju (시원 소주-"refreshing soju") is the local and most popular brand. Ipsaeju (잎새주 - "leaf alcohol") is popular in the Jeollanam-do region. The Daegu Metropolitan Area has its own soju manufacturer, Kumbokju, with the popular brand Cham (참). Further north in the same province, Andong Soju is one of Korea's few remaining traditionally distilled brands of soju. On the Special Self-Governing Province of Jeju-do, Hallasan Soju is the most common brand, being named after the island's main mountain Mt. Halla. Also, there is pureun-bam (푸른 밤/meaning: blue night) made by Jeju-soju. In Gyeongsangnam-do and Ulsan, the most popular is Good Day (Hangul: 좋은데이), produced by Muhak in Changwon. However, as soon as one crosses the border from Ulsan north to Gyeongju in Gyeongsangbuk-do, it is almost impossible to buy White Soju, and the most popular brands are Chamisul and Cham. Since 2015, the new trends of soju include fruit soju and sparkling soju, which have become increasingly popular in Korea, especially for young people.

New American producers are entering the market. Some, like Tokki Soju and West 32 Soju, with initial market penetration in major markets like New York, are finding critical success. Tokki Soju won double gold for their barrel-aged soju, Tokki Soju Gold, in the San Francisco Spirits Competition 2021 and 2022. West 32 Soju won a gold medal at the 2017 New York International Spirits Competition.

A new all natural soju distilled in Germany called ISAE is also entering the premium soju market. It is distilled according to the German Purity Law (the Reinheitsgebot) for grain spirits of 1789 and uses 100% regional winter wheat and organic rice.

Consumption

Although beer, whiskey, and wine have been gaining popularity in recent years, soju remains one of the most popular alcoholic beverages in Korea because of its ready availability and relatively low price. More than 3 billion bottles were consumed in South Korea in 2004. In 2006, it was estimated that the average adult Korean (older than 20) had consumed 90 bottles of soju during that year. In 2014, it was reported that South Koreans of drinking age consumed an average of 13.7 shots of spirit per week, the highest per capita consumption of alcoholic spirits of any country.  However, due to the lower concentration of alcohol in soju compared to other hard spirits and the lack of an international standard for the volume of a shot, this does not necessarily imply a larger consumption of alcohol from hard spirits.

Cocktails

While soju is traditionally consumed straight, a few cocktails and mixed drinks use soju as a base spirit. Beer and soju can be mixed to create somaek (소맥), a portmanteau of the words soju and maekju (맥주  beer). Flavored soju is also available. It is also popular to blend fruits with soju and to drink it in "slushy" form. Another very popular flavored soju is yogurt soju (요구르트 소주), which is a combination of soju, yogurt, and lemon lime soda.

A poktan-ju (폭탄주) ("bomb drink") consists of a shot glass of soju dropped into a pint of beer (similar to a boilermaker); it is drunk quickly. This is similar to the Japanese sake bomb.

Soju is sometimes mistakenly referred to as cheongju (청주), a Korean rice wine. Mass-produced soju is also mistaken for Chinese baijiu, a grain liquor, and shōchū, a Japanese liquor.

See also 

Andong soju from Andong region
Baijiu, of China
Sake, of Japan
Shōchū, of Japan
Awamori, of Okinawa
Lao Khao, of Laos and Thailand
Rice wine
Korean alcoholic beverages
Korean cuisine
Korean beer

Citations

General and cited references

External links 

 Popular alcohols from Korea 

 
Alcoholic drinks
Distilled drinks
Korean cuisine
Korean distilled drinks
South Korean cuisine